Solitary is a 2008 acoustic rock album by Don Dokken (singer of his original band Dokken). The album was only sold to fans attending his tour for the album, but was rereleased digitally with additional tracks in 2014, then on physical media in 2020. It was released on October 21, 2008, exactly eighteen years after his first solo album, Up from the Ashes.

Track listing

Personnel
Don Dokken – vocals, guitar
 Wyn Davis – guitars, bass, synths
Michael Thompson – guitars, bass
 Steve Ornest – guitars
Tony Franklin – bass
 Frank Lentz – drums
 Gary Ferguson – drums
Vinnie Colaiuta – drums
John Schreiner – piano, synth
 John Keane – piano, synth
Kelly Keeling – background vocals on "Where The Grass Is Green"

References

Don Dokken albums
2008 albums